Luther Saxon (July 12, 1916 – September 12, 2017) was an American tenor who appeared in the role of Joe in the 1943 Broadway musical Carmen Jones. He was born in Fairfax, South Carolina. He also appeared in the original cast album (Decca DL 9021), recorded in 1955 as well as Susanna, Don't You Cry [Musical, Romance, Original] along with the Hall Johnson Choir during May 22, 1939 - May 27, 1939. During his career he toured around the world as a soloist with the de Paur’s Infantry Chorus. He died at the age of 101 in September 2017.

References

1916 births
2017 deaths
American centenarians
People from Allendale County, South Carolina
American tenors
Men centenarians